Rastriya Panchayat was the official legislature (parliament) during the Panchayat regime of Nepal that effectively functioned from 1960 to 1990. Its head office was at the "Gallery Baithak" in Singha Durbar, Kathmandu. In the 1980s, it consisted of more than 120 members among which 105 members were directly elected by the people, while the king was to nominate 20 percent of its members, i.e. 19 members were nominated by the monarch.

The Rastriya Panchayat was dissolved by King Birendra after the People's Movement I in 1990 and replaced by a bicameral legislature with a fully elected House of Representatives.

Speakers 1963-1990 

Source:

Some notable Rastriya Panchayat members

 Dr. Tulsi Giri (First Prime Minister of Panchayat System)
 Surya Bahadur Thapa (Former Prime Minister)
 Kirti Nidhi Bista (Former Prime Minister)
 Nagendra Prasad Rijal (Former Prime Minister)
 Lokendra Bahadur Chand (Former Prime Minister)
 Marich Man Singh Shrestha (Former Prime Minister)
 Arjun Narasingha K.C. (Former Education, Health, & Urban Development Minister)
 Nava Raj Subedi (Former Defense Minister and Chairman of Rastriya Panchayat)
 Giri Prasad Burathoki (Former Defense and Assistant Minister)
  Padam Thakurathi 
 Hem Bahadur Malla 
  Dirgha Raj Prasai (Former Consultant of Nepal Administrative Staff College and Former Adviser Ministry Development Committee)
  Bhim Prasad Gauchan
  Dharma Prasad Upadhyaya
  Dambar Bam
  Bhim Bahadur Shrestha
 Ram Raja Prasad Singh
 Dr. Prakash Chandra Lohani

See also 

 List of members elected in the 1981 Nepalese general election
 List of members elected in the 1986 Nepalese general election

References 
 

Nepal
Parliament of Nepal
1960 establishments in Nepal
1990 disestablishments in Nepal